What's Cookin' Doc? is a 1943-produced, 1944 Warner Bros. cartoon in the Merrie Melodies series, directed by Bob Clampett, and stars Bugs Bunny. The short was also written by Michael Sasanoff, and was animated by Robert McKimson, along with uncredited work by Rod Scribner, Phil Monroe and Virgil Ross. The film was released on January 8, 1944. 

The title is a variant on Bugs' catch-phrase "What's up Doc?". It also hints at one of the scenes in the picture.

Plot 
The plot centers on the Academy Awards presentation. The action begins with live action color film footage of various Hollywood scenes (edited from A Star Is Born), narrated by Robert C. Bruce. It leads up to the Big Question of the evening: Who will win "the" Oscar? The film shows the stereotypical red carpet arrivals of stars, as well as a human emcee starting to introduce the Oscar show.

At this point, the film switches to animation, with the shadow of a now-animated emcee (and now voiced by Mel Blanc) continuing to introduce the Oscar, and Bugs (also Mel Blanc's voice, as usual) assuring the viewer that "it's in da bag; I'm a cinch to win." Bugs is stunned when the award goes instead to James Cagney (who had actually won in the previous year's ceremony, for Warner's Yankee Doodle Dandy). Shock turns to anger as Bugs declares the results to be "sa-bo-TAH-gee" and demands a recount.

Bugs then tries to make his case by showing clips from Hiawatha's Rabbit Hunt (here titled Little Hiawatha) as proof of his allegedly superior acting (an inside joke, as the cartoon had actually been nominated for an Oscar and lost). He hurls a set of film cans off-screen and tells someone named "Smokey" to "roll 'em!" Bugs tells the audience that these are "some of [his] best scenes". Immediately, a "stag reel" (with the title card depicting a grinning stag) starts to roll, and the startled Bugs quickly stops it and switches to the right film. The clip starts with a small title card of "WARNER BROS. present" with a small fanfare, followed by a title card of "BUGS BUNNY" in extremely large letters, as a brassy orchestral fanfare plays, and ends with an end title card of Bugs bending over to show his cotton tail and giving his toothy grin as a comically sped up version of the Merrie Melodies end theme (Merrily We Roll Along) is heard. There is then a parody of aggressive salesmanship: Bugs beats a bass drum and parades across the stage with signs such as “ Let Bugs Have It” and “Give It To Bugs”. He then quickly passes out cigars en masse to the audience.

Finally, Bugs pleads with the audience, "What do you say, folks? Do I get it? Or do I get it?" (echoing Fredric March's drunken appeal to the Academy Award banquet audience in A Star Is Born). The emcee asks the audience (in an affected nasal voice), "Shall we give it to him, folks?" and they yell, "Yeah, let's give it to him!" whereupon they pelt Bugs with fruits and vegetables (enabling him to briefly do a Carmen Miranda impression)... and an ersatz Oscar labeled "booby prize", which is actually a gold-plated rabbit statue. Bugs is so pleased at winning it, he remarks, "I'll even take youse to bed wit' me every night!" The statue suddenly comes alive, asks in a voice like that of radio character, Bert Gordon, "Do you mean it?", smooches the startled bunny, and takes on an effeminate, hip-swiveling pose, and the Bay-Woop! sound effect ends the cartoon.

Analysis
The subtext of the short is the self-consciousness of Warner Bros. Cartoons about their then-lack of success at the Academy Awards. The studio had yet to win an Academy Award for Best Animated Short Film. The clips from Hiawatha's Rabbit Hunt (1941) allude to this subtext. It was a former nominee for the award and had lost to Lend a Paw (1941).

The live-action film footage was derived from the film A Star Is Born (1937). Footage depict the footprints of the stars at the Chinese Theatre, and nightlife at the Trocadero and the Cocoanut Grove.

The premise of the film is that Bugs Bunny is competing for the Academy Award for Best Actor. He demonstrates his acting ability by transforming into Jerry Colonna, Bing Crosby, Cecil B. DeMille, Katharine Hepburn, and Edward G. Robinson. As the announcer lists the winner's traits, Bugs transforms to illustrate that they all apply to him: dramatic acting, refined comedy, skill at character roles, and prowess as a screen lover. He demonstrates his character acting by becoming Frankenstein's monster and his romantic acting by changing into Charles Boyer and romancing a carrot.

Bugs campaigns for the award by addressing the people in the movie audience. His methods of campaigning include dispensing cigars, drum beating, and glad-handing. He thus earns a booby prize, a second-class award reminiscent of the miniature Oscars awarded to Snow White and the Seven Dwarfs (1937). The implication is that awards are not won by the most talented and deserving, but those capable of lobbying.

The short includes a subtle reference to World War II. There is a newspaper headline announcing the Academy Awards. A sub-headline on the same page reads "Jap Cruiser Blown Up". This is a reference to the contemporary Imperial Japanese Navy. Another sub-headline notes, "Adolph Hitler commits suicide".

Home media
 The short occurs in its entirety in the documentary Bugs Bunny: Superstar Part 1, which is available as a special feature on Discs 1 and 2 of the Looney Tunes Golden Collection: Volume 4, although it has not been remastered or released independently in that series. 
 It also appears as a bonus short on two DVD releases; Warner Bros. Home Entertainment Academy Awards Animation Collection (Disc 3), and on Captains of the Clouds, both in its 1995 dubbed print version.
It was released on the  Bugs Bunny 80th Anniversary Collection fully restored by Jerry Beck and George Feltenstein, making it the first time the cartoon has been fully restored.

Sources

See also
 Looney Tunes and Merrie Melodies filmography (1940–1949)
 List of Bugs Bunny cartoons
 Mickey's Gala Premiere
 Mickey's Polo Team
 Mother Goose Goes To Hollywood
 The Autograph Hound
 Hollywood Steps Out
 Hollywood Daffy
 Slick Hare

References

External links
 

1944 films
1944 short films
1944 animated films
1940s animated short films
1944 comedy films
Merrie Melodies short films
Films directed by Bob Clampett
Films set in Los Angeles
Films about Hollywood, Los Angeles
Short films with live action and animation
Animation based on real people
Cultural depictions of actors
Cultural depictions of Bing Crosby
Cultural depictions of James Cagney
Cultural depictions of Edward G. Robinson
Films scored by Carl Stalling
Films produced by Leon Schlesinger
Bugs Bunny films
1940s Warner Bros. animated short films
1940s English-language films